Schritt für Schritt is the debut solo album by German recording artist Nadja Benaissa. It was released by Universal Music Urban on February 24, 2006 in German-speaking Europe. Her first solo effort following the disbandment of her former band, No Angels, it signaled a breakaway from the group's Europop sound in favor of a more soul-influenced pop album with German lyrics. Benaissa co-wrote the whole album, which features production by Tino Oac and Giuseppe Porrello, with additional credits from DJ Release, Audiotreats and Fairtone. Upon its release, Schritt für Schritt underperformed, debuting and peaking at number 71 on the German Albums Chart.

Track listing

Credits and personnel
Credits adapted from the liner notes of Schritt für Schritt.

 Susanne Bader – brass
 Loomis Green – bass guitar
 Jens Klingelhöfer – guitar
 Luniz – guitar
 Alex Nies – drums / percussion
 Andreas Neubauer – drums

 Annabell Owusu-Ansah – viola
 Giuseppe Porrello – guitar
 Christoph Riebling – piano
 Wolf Schönecker – guitar
 Florian Sitzmann – organ / cello

Production

 Executive producers: Nadja Benaissa, Mengstu Zeleke
 Producer: Audiotreats, Fairtone, Tino Oac, Giuseppe Porrello, DJ Release
 Engineers: Nadja Benaissa, Loomis Green, Baba Omar
 Mixing: Ulf Hattwig, Wolfgang Manns, Toni Oac, Florian Sitzmann

 Mastering: Ulf Hattwig
 Art Direction: Oliver Daxenbichler
 Photography & Design: Oliver Daxenbichler

Charts

Release history

References

External links

2006 debut albums